National Solidarity Party may refer to one of the following parties.

National Solidarity Party (Guatemala)
National Solidarity Party (Peru)
National Solidarity Party (Portugal)
National Solidarity Party (Singapore)
National Solidarity Party of Afghanistan
National Solidarity Party (Yemen)